Turkish Technic (Turkish Airlines Maintenance Center), is the maintenance, repair and overhaul (MRO) center of Turkish Airlines. Third party airlines are also served. Turkish Technic is headquartered at Atatürk Airport (ISL) and owns a maintenance hangar at Istanbul Airport (IST) on the European side of Istanbul. However, a new complex built at Sabiha Gökçen International Airport (SAW) on the Asian (Anatolia) side of Istanbul, formerly named Turkish HABOM (HABOM being short for "Aviation MRO"), is poised to become the main center of operations.

Turkish Technic in brief

Turkish Technic was incorporated in 2006. It operates in three hangars for narrowbody and widebody airplanes and a VIP & light airplanes hangar in IST, in a total enclosed area of 130,000 m2 with a workforce of 3,000 employees. Approximately 1,800 of these are technicians and almost 1,300 of these technicians are licensed (LAE - Licensed Aircraft Engineers). The newly built facilities in SAW encompass a hangar for 11 single-aisle aircraft and a separate hangar for three long-haul airframes. The complex is a total enclosed area of 380,000 m2 with more than 3,100 employees. A separate narrowbody hangar exists in Esenboğa International Airport (ESB), Ankara.

Turkish Technic is a member of IATP (International Airlines Technical Pool), ELMO (European Line Maintenance Organization), and Airbus MRO Network. Line maintenance stations exist at 24 domestic and 30 international airports.

Turkish Technic's facilities

Aircraft maintenance hangars and workshops
 Hangar #1 has a total enclosed area of 51,000 m2 and can accommodate 2 widebody (Airbus A310) and 3 narrowbody (Boeing 737-800) aircraft simultaneously.
 Hangar #2 has a total enclosed area of 80,000 m2 and can accommodate 3 widebody (2 ea. Airbus A340 and 1 ea. Airbus A310) and 4 narrowbody (Boeing 737-800) aircraft simultaneously.
 Hangar #3 was bought from MNG Teknik and has a separate painting facility. Maintenance capabilities for the Boeing 757 and Boeing 767 were also added with this acquisition.
 Non-destructive testing workshop
 Emergency equipment workshop
 Aircraft painting workshop
 Aircraft seating workshop
 Sheet metal, structural repair & composite workshop
 Cabin interior & textiles workshop
 Dry cleaning workshop

Engine maintenance workshops
 Engine overhaul workshop
 APU overhaul workshop
 Engine & APU test cells
 Fuel systems workshop

Manufacturing & repair workshops 
 Electro-plating workshop
 Welding workshop
 Machining workshop

Component maintenance workshops (Avionic Shops)
 Radio workshop
 Instruments workshop
 Electrical and battery workshop
 Automatic test equipment (ATE) workshop
 Calibration workshop

Component maintenance workshops (Hydro-Mechanical Shops)
 Hydraulic workshop
 Mechanical workshop
 Electro-mechanical workshop
 Pneumatic workshop
 Oxygen regulator & recharging workshop (US DOT D030 approved workshop)
 Landing gear workshop
 Brake workshop
 Wheels & tires workshop

Turkish Technic's certifications
 JAA, JAR-145
 EASA, EASA part-145
 FAA, FAA air agency certificate
 US DOT D030 approval for oxygen regulator & recharging workshop

Turkish Technic's capabilities
Turkish Technic performs aircraft base and line maintenance, engine and APU maintenance and component maintenance services for the types listed below. Most engine work has moved to Turkish Engine Center at SAW, on the Asian/Anatolian side of Istanbul.

Aircraft Base and Line Maintenance Capabilities

Engine Maintenance Capabilities

APU Maintenance Capabilities

Component Maintenance Capabilities
 Airbus A300-B2/B4/C4/F4 Series
 Airbus A300-600
 Airbus A310-200/-300
 Airbus A320 Family
 Airbus A340-200/-300
 Boeing 727-200
 Boeing 737-300/-400/-500
 Boeing 737-600/-700/-800/-900

Specialized Services
 NDT - Non-destructive testing (Level 2) - Ultrasonic testing, magnetic particle testing, Eddy current testing, liquid penetrant testing, radiographic X-ray testing in accordance with EN 4179 and NAS 410
 Aeropartners of Boeing certified winglet modification center for B737 Next Generation Aircraft
 Complete stripping & aircraft painting
 Cabin interior refurbishment
 SSIP & CPCP Programmes and structural modifications
 Avionic modifications such as TCAS, RVSM, EGPWS
 Plasma spraying, welding, electro-plating, machining

External links

 Turkish Airlines
 Turkish Technic
 TEC (Turkish Engine Center)

References

Aerospace companies
Aircraft engineering companies
Aircraft maintenance companies
Turkish Airlines